Bouabid Bouden (born 1 February 1982 in Rabat) is a Moroccan footballer.

Bouden has played for Kawkab Marrakech, Odense Boldklub and French team RC Lens. He also played on loan for AS Beauvais Oise in Ligue 2.

He was part of the Moroccan 2004 Olympic football team, which exited in the first round, finishing third in group D behind group winners Iraq and runners-up Costa Rica. In total Bouden has been capped 7 times for the Moroccan national team.

References

External links
 
 

1982 births
Living people
Moroccan footballers
Footballers from Rabat
Morocco international footballers
AS FAR (football) players
RC Lens players
AS Beauvais Oise players
Al Ahli SC (Doha) players
Odense Boldklub players
Kawkab Marrakech players
COD Meknès players
Olympic footballers of Morocco
Footballers at the 2004 Summer Olympics
Ligue 1 players
Ligue 2 players
Qatar Stars League players
Danish Superliga players
Botola players
Association football forwards
Expatriate footballers in France
Expatriate footballers in Qatar
Expatriate men's footballers in Denmark
Moroccan expatriate sportspeople in France
Moroccan expatriate sportspeople in Qatar
Moroccan expatriate sportspeople in Denmark